Mutlu Topçu (born 16 November 1970 in Bursa) is a Turkish football coach and a former player.

He played his first game for Turkey against Iceland on 12 October 1994.

References

External links
Profile at TFF

1970 births
Living people
Turkish footballers
Turkey international footballers
Turkey under-21 international footballers
Beşiktaş J.K. footballers
Adanaspor footballers
Association football defenders
Sportspeople from Bursa
Mediterranean Games silver medalists for Turkey
Mediterranean Games medalists in football
Competitors at the 1991 Mediterranean Games
Turkish football managers